Trancoso Municipality is one of the 58 municipalities of Zacatecas, Mexico.

Municipalities of Zacatecas